Life Is a Festival is a 2008 album by Dutch electronic musician Don Diablo. The genre of the album ranges from house music to hip hop. The album includes multiple various past single releases and even created new ones.

The album was originally intended to be called Respect Doesn't Pay the Bills, which was written in most of the physical single releases before 2008. Instead, the working title became the main title of the album's eighth track.

Track listing

Charts

References

External links 
 Life Is A Festival at Discogs
 Life Is a Festival - iTunes

2008 debut albums
Don Diablo albums